Pyrobombus (also known as Fiery-tailed bees) is a subgenus of bumblebees, with its centres of diversity in Central Asia and north-western North America. Nearly a fifth of all Bombus species fall within Pyrobombus and its member species vary considerably in size, appearance and behaviour. it covers 43 species of bees and is the largest subgenus of bumblebees, covering almost 50% of the North American fauna. They are seen to be declined by 6%, which may be an undervalued statistic, although not as high as other groups of bees. Pyrobombus bees also face issues such as climate change, loss of habitat, urbanization, and industrial agriculture. This subgenus of bees can pollinate that helps plants fertilise and grow fruit that is essential to the biodiversity and life of the environment. Commonly, Pyrobombus bees are used for beekeeping as they are pollinators. They can be for wax, honey, venom, combs, and such which may be collected for commercial use. This subgenus may vary in their characteristics such as body size, wingspan, and tongue length for individual species, but like all bees, they possess wings, a head, thorax, and abdomen.

Morphology 
The Pyrobombus are fairly small bees. They are the largest subgenus group of the Bombus and the most diverse in its morphology. Along with its diversity, there are few similarities between the species. The Pyrobombus varies in tongue length, head shape, mouth-parts, wingspan and such. The coat color of the Pyrobombus is physically similar to other bees in different subgenera under the Bombus, with black, yellow, and orange pattern arrangements and with some species, the coat can have white patches and or stripes. Like all bees, species of the Pyrobombus have translucent wings that can have different colour tinges of clear, black, brown and amber.

Phylogeny   
Reasons for investigating the origins of Pyrobombus can be due to questionable physical resemblance between the species and enzymes. Some studies of Pyrobombus phylogeny concludes this subgenus may not be monophyletic and is instead polyphyletic, where it shares multiple evolutionary ancestors; however, it is argued results that lead for the nature of Pyrobombus to be polyphyletic may be due to a smaller taxon representation. In the study by Hines, Cameron and Williams, they have gathered a larger taxon representation to investigate the phylogeny of Pyrobombus, and conclude that the phylogeny of the subgenus Pyrobombus to be monophyletic. They were able to analyze 36 of the 43 recognized species. There are numerous studies that have supported that Pyrobombus is paraphyletic and suggest the Pyrobombus belong in two different phyletic lines. In a study by Plowright and Stephen (1973) have examined 18 different enzymes and found the taxon sample had close relationships with B. jonellus and B. frigidus. Their studies have also aligned with other independent researchers."More extensive molecular analyses suggest Pyrobombus is monophyletic and most closely related to Bombus s.s. and Alpinobombus." (Williams, Paul. 2006)"A genus-wide phenetic study of wing venation by Plowright and Stephen (1973) resulted in a polyphyletic Pyrobombus, with some species more closely related to species of the subgenera Melanobombus." (Williams, Paul. 2006)

Habitat and nesting   

Principally, Pyrobombus have their nests underground rather than the surface, which is common amongst the Bombus. In design, Pyrobombus constructs its nest with no elaborate entrances to its underground canal. Generally, plant material such as dry grass, sticks, petals, and other small deposits would be collected and accumulated around and or in the nest canal for camouflage. This camouflage of its nest is also known as a pseudo-nest particularly to avoid predators and protection against bad weather. These colonies would often be small with some species being flexible with their site preference. European Pyrobombus species have the tendency to be more stubborn in site preference, whereby their selection of nesting areas are limited.

In the nest, there are cells. These cells are pollen lumps that are occupied by eggs and for the young. Pyrobombus have their eggs isolately laid each in a subcell laid vertically for the first cells in position which is the most common behavior amongst all bees except for the Alpinobombus. "The arrangement of eggs in the first cell arrangement for Pyrobombus is generally two eggs at the center and three on each side, forming three rows." Upon the population of Pyrobombus developing and growing, the nests would inevitably need to expand in size. The construction of new cells would lay on top of the previous cells. This act would be also known as brooding. The following broods would have eggs laid horizontally or on top in position.

Pollination 

Pollination is important to preserve the ecosystem. It heavily relies on pollinators, like Pyrobombus. Pyrobombus collect pollen from a variety of flora by using its hind legs (scopa) and have pollen trapped between the body hairs. Through vibrating at high frequencies, pollen can be expelled from the bee's body to transport back to their colony and other plants for fertilization. This is the act of buzz pollination in which most species of the Bombus behave that allows for flora to be distributed and fertilised.

Ecology 
Pyrobombus are commonly found in open environments such as meadows, grass fields, and forests. At these locations, bees would face predators. Common predators would be bears, birds, badgers and hornets.

Not all bees are generalist forages. Bees vary in dietary and foraging needs that influence their population and flora growth.

Ecology in Europe

Pyrobombus brodmannicus 
P. brodmannicus are found in higher altitudes like the French Alps. Although it forages on a variety of plants, the P. brodmannicus bees in Caucasia specialise in the Boraginaceae in which the numbers are low.

Distribution   
Pyrobombus bees are commonly widespread in the Northern Hemisphere and covers close to 50% of North American fauna. Most Pyrobombus bee species are experiencing habitat loss, with a few endangered in certain geographical locations.

Species list 

The subgenus contains the following species:

Bombus abnormis (Tkalcu, 1968)
Bombus ardens Smith, 1879
Bombus avanus (Skorikov, 1938)
Bombus beaticola (Tkalcu, 1968)
Bombus bifarius Cresson, 1878
Bombus bimaculatus Cresson, 1863
Bombus biroi Vogt, 1911
Bombus brodmannicus Vogt, 1909
Bombus caliginosus (Frison, 1927)
Bombus centralis Cresson, 1864
Bombus cingulatus Wahlberg, 1854
Bombus cockerelli Franklin, 1913
Bombus ephippiatus Say, 1837
Bombus flavescens Smith, 1852
Bombus flavifrons Cresson, 1863
Bombus frigidus Smith, 1854
Bombus haematurus Kriechbaumer, 1870
Bombus huntii Greene, 1860
Bombus hypnorum (Linnaeus, 1758)
Bombus impatiens Cresson, 1863
Bombus infirmus (Tkalcu, 1968)
Bombus infrequens (Tkalcu, 1989)
Bombus johanseni Sladen, 1919
Bombus jonellus (Kirby, 1802)
Bombus kotzschi Reinig, 1940
Bombus lapponicus (Fabricius, 1793)
Bombus lemniscatus Skorikov, 1912
Bombus lepidus Skorikov, 1912
Bombus luteipes Richards, 1934
Bombus melanopygus Nylander, 1848
Bombus mirus (Tkalcu, 1968)
Bombus mixtus Cresson, 1878
Bombus modestus Eversmann, 1852
Bombus monticola Smith, 1844
?Bombus oceanicus Friese, 1909
Bombus parthenius Richards, 1934
Bombus perplexus Cresson, 1863
Bombus picipes Richards, 1934
Bombus pratorum (Linnaeus, 1761)
Bombus pressus (Frison, 1935)
Bombus pyrenaeus Pérez, 1880
Bombus rotundiceps Friese, 1916
Bombus sandersoni Franklin, 1913
Bombus sitkensis Nylander, 1848
Bombus sonani (Frison, 1934)
Bombus subtypicus (Skorikov, 1914)
Bombus sylvicola Kirby, 1837
Bombus ternarius Say, 1837
Bombus vagans Smith, 1854
Bombus vancouverensis Cresson, 1878
Bombus vandykei (Frison, 1927)
Bombus vosnesenskii Radoszkowski, 1862
Bombus wangae Williams et al., 2009
?Bombus wilmattae Cockerell, 1912

References

Bumblebees
Insect subgenera